Ferenc Varga (3 July 1925 – 17 January 2023) was a Hungarian sprint canoer who competed in the early to mid-1950s. He won a bronze medal in the K-2 10000 m event at the 1952 Summer Olympics in Helsinki.

Varga also won a bronze medal in the K-4 10000 m event at the 1954 ICF Canoe Sprint World Championships in Mâcon.

Varga died on 17 January 2023, at the age of 97.

References

External links

1925 births
2023 deaths
20th-century Hungarian people
Canoeists at the 1952 Summer Olympics
Hungarian male canoeists
Medalists at the 1952 Summer Olympics
Olympic canoeists of Hungary
Olympic bronze medalists for Hungary
Olympic medalists in canoeing
ICF Canoe Sprint World Championships medalists in kayak